Gothenburg Municipality (Göteborgs kommun), Sweden is subdivided into 10 stadsdelsnämndsområden (roughly "city district committee areas"). The term is often translated to borough. But they are really not boroughs, as they are not legal entities or juristic persons of their own, but organs of the central municipal administration. The members of the committees are appointed by the kommunfullmäktige (municipal assembly) and not by the electorates of the respective "boroughs". They therefore represent the political majority of the municipality as a whole.

Gothenburg previously had 20 boroughs, but after a decision in the municipal assembly in January 2010 some of the boroughs were merged, leaving a total of 10 boroughs. The merge were implemented on 1 January 2011.

Each "borough" is divided into a number of officially defined residential districts (Swedish: primärområden). There are 94 districts. These are usually created by natural neighbourhoods, but sometimes consist of more than one traditional district.

The "boroughs" are responsible for, among other things, preschool, compulsory schooling, leisure, culture, social services, home-help service and care for the elderly.

Below is a list of the "boroughs" in Gothenburg, as well as the official districts. Also included are traditional districts, where these are part of an official district. The list of traditional districts is incomplete.

List of boroughs in Gothenburg after the 2011 merge

Source:
Norra Hisingen (Northern Hisingen) (Previously the boroughs Backa, Kärra-Rödbo and Tuve-Säve)
Angered (Previously the boroughs Gunnared and Lärjedalen)
Östra Göteborg (Eastern Gothenburg) (Previously the boroughs Bergsjön and Kortedala)
Västra Hisingen (Western Hisingen) (Previously the boroughs Biskopsgården and Torslanda)
Lundby 
Majorna-Linné (Previously the boroughs Linnéstaden and Majorna)
Centrum
Örgryte-Härlanda
Västra Göteborg (Western Gothenburg) (Previously the boroughs Södra Skärgården and Tynnered/Älvsborg)
Askim-Frölunda-Högsbo (Previously the boroughs Askim, Frölunda and Högsbo)

Boroughs before the 2011 merge

Eastern Gothenburg

Härlanda borough

Officially defined districts
Björkekärr
Härlanda
Kålltorp
Torpa

Traditional districts
Björkekärr
Fräntorp
Kålltorp
Torpa
Vidkärr

Örgryte borough

Officially defined districts
Olskroken
Redbergslid
Bagaregården
Kallebäck
Skår
Överås
Kärralund
Lunden

Other
Angered
Angereds Centrum (officially defined)
Hammarkullen (officially defined)
Lövgärdet (officially defined)
Rannebergen (officially defined)
Gårdstensbergen (officially defined)
Hjällbo (officially defined)
Eriksbo (officially defined)
Agnesberg (officially defined)
Linnarhult (officially defined)
Gunnilse (officially defined)
Bergum (officially defined)
Askim
Askim (officially defined)
Hovås (officially defined)
Billdal
Backa
Backa (officially defined)
Skogome (officially defined)
Brunnsbo (officially defined)
Skälltorp  (officially defined)
Bergsjön
Västra Bergsjön (officially defined)
Östra Bergsjön (officially defined)
Biskopsgården
Norra Biskopsgården (officially defined)
Södra Biskopsgården (officially defined)
Jättesten (officially defined)
Svartedalen (officially defined)
Länsmansgården (officially defined)
Centrum ("Centre")
Guldheden (officially defined)
Heden (officially defined)
Johanneberg (officially defined)
Krokslätt (officially defined)
Landala (officially defined)
Stampen (officially defined)
Vasastaden (officially defined)
Lorensberg (officially defined)
Inom Vallgraven (officially defined)
Frölunda
Järnbrott (officially defined)
Tofta (officially defined)
Ruddalen (officially defined)
Frölunda Torg (officially defined)
Högsbo
Kaverös (officially defined)
Flatås (officially defined)
Högsbohöjd (officially defined)
Högsbotorp (officially defined)
Högsbo  (officially defined)
Kortedala
Gamlestaden (officially defined)
Utby (officially defined)
Södra Kortedala (officially defined)
Norra Kortedala (officially defined)
Kärra-Rödbo
Kärra (officially defined)
Rödbo (officially defined)
Linnéstaden
Masthugget (officially defined)
Änggården (officially defined)
Haga (officially defined)
Annedal (officially defined)
Olivedal (officially defined)
Lundby
Sannegården (officially defined)
Brämaregården (officially defined)
Kvillebäcken (officially defined)
Slättadamm (officially defined)
Kärrdalen (officially defined)
Majorna
Kungsladugård (officially defined)
Sanna (officially defined)
Majorna (officially defined)
Stigberget (officially defined)
Styrsö
Styrsö (officially defined)
Asperö
Brännö
Donsö
Köpstadsö
Styrsö
Vargö
Vrångö
Torslanda
Hjuvik (officially defined)
Nolered (officially defined)
Björlanda (officially defined)
Arendal (officially defined)
Tuve-Säve
Tuve (officially defined)
Säve (officially defined)
Tynnered
Bratthammar (officially defined)
Guldringen (officially defined)
Skattegården (officially defined)
Ängås (officially defined)
Önnered (officially defined)
Grevegården (officially defined)
Näset (officially defined)
Kannebäck (officially defined)
Älvsborg
Fiskebäck (officially defined)
Långedrag (officially defined)
Hagen (officially defined)
Grimmered (officially defined)

References 

Gothenburg